Ming Dynasty, also known as Tianxia, is a Chinese television series based on historical events in the late Ming dynasty during the reign of the Tianqi Emperor. It was directed by Wu Ziniu and was first broadcast on GZTV in China in December 2007. The series' working title was Da Ming Tianxia (大明天下).

Cast

 Wang Ya'nan as the Tianqi Emperor
 Song Jia as Madam Ke
 Wang Huichun as Wei Zhongxian
 Jiang Xin as Murong Qiu
 Tao Zeru as Wang Linguang
 Nie Yuan as Mu Yunzhou
 Du Zhiguo as Yang Lian
 Wan Hongjie as Qian Jiayi
 Rao Minli as Yu Qian'er
 Zong Fengyan as Prince Xin
 Xing Yufei as Empress Xiaoaizhe
 Heizi as Luo Yunpeng
 Xi Yuli as Consort Zhou
 Chen Kai as Wu Dajin
 Zhang Jin as Wu Erjin
 Yao Di as Xiaohong
 Ma Yuke as Zhou Jiyuan
 Wang Jiahe as Ke Guangxian
 Gao Tianhao as Cui Chengxiu
 Dong Ziwu as Prince Rui
 Yu Lei as Prince Hui
 Wang Zhengjia as Tian Ergeng
 Yang Hongtao as Wang Tiqian
 Wu Yujin as Miao Yun
 Wang Jianing as Liu Quanhong
 Wang Zhongwei as Wu Ping
 Gu Haibo as Wang Yucheng
 Zhao Changzhou as Ye Changbao
 Guo Jia as Ye Changhu
 Zhou Yanxing as Xiaoling'er
 Wu Yuyang as Xiaoyu'er
 Shu Yan as Concubine Yang
 Jin Yiran

External links
  Ming Dynasty on Sina.com

2007 Chinese television series debuts
Television series set in the Ming dynasty
Mandarin-language television shows
Chinese historical television series
Television series set in the 17th century